Coleanthera is a plant genus in the family Ericaceae. The genus is endemic to Western Australia, and is currently accepted (1 January 2021) by Plants of the World online, and the Council of Heads of Australasian Herbaria, but not by the Western Australian Herbarium, where it has been subsumed into the genus, Styphelia, for the phylogenetic reasons given by Darren M. Crayn, Michael Hislop and Caroline Puente-Lelièvre. 

It was first described in 1859 by Sergei Sergeyevich Sheglejev, and the type species is Coleanthera myrtoides.

Description
The fruit is a 5-celled drupe. The flowers are hermaphroditic and are fertilised by either insects or birds. The calyces of plants in this genus have five sepals and there are five petals.

Species
There are three accepted species in the genus:
Coleanthera coelophylla (A.Cunn. ex DC.) Benth.
Coleanthera myrtoides Stschegl.
Coleanthera virgata Stschegl.

References

Ericaceae genera
Plants described in 1859
Epacridoideae